Harry Sinclair Drago (March 20, 1887 – October 25, 1979) was an American writer of screenplays and Westerns.  He also wrote under the names Stewart Cross, Kirk Deming, Will Ermine, Bliss Lomax, J. Wesley Putnam and Grant Sinclair.

Partial filmography

 Out of the Silent North (1922)
 Playthings of Desire (1924)
 Whispering Sage (1927)
 Silver Valley (1927)
 A Horseman of the Plains (1928)
 Hello Cheyenne (1928)
 Painted Post (1928)
 The Cowboy Kid (1928)
 The Overland Telegraph (1929)
 Where East Is East (1929)
 The Desert Rider (1929)
 The King of the Kongo (1929)
 Lotus Lady (1930)
 Murder in the Library (1933) (from Playthings of Desire)
 Secret of the Wastelands (1941)
 Buckskin Frontier (1943)
 The Leather Burners (1943)
 Colt Comrades (1943)

Bibliography
 Red River Valley
 Lost Bonanzas: True Stories of Buried Treasure and Lost Mines of the American West
 Outlaws on Horseback: The History of the Organized Bands of Bank and Train Robbers Who Terrorized the Prairie Towns of Missouri, Kansas, Indian Territory, and Oklahoma for Half a Century
 The Great Range Wars: Violence on the Grasslands
 Notorious Ladies Of The Frontier
 Great American Cattle Trails: The Story of the Old Cow Paths of the East and the Longhorn Highways of the Plains
 The Legend Makers: Tales of the Old-Time Peace Officers and Desperadoes of the Frontier
 Pay-Off at Black Hawk
 The Steamboaters; From the Early Side-Wheelers to the Big Packets
 River of Gold
 Out of the Silent North
 Trigger Gospel
 Road Agents And Train Robbers; Half A Century Of Western Banditry
 Whispering Sage
 Guardians of the Sage
 Wild, Woolly & Wicked: The History of the Kansas Cow Towns And the Texas Cattle trade
 Where the Loon Calls
 Canal Days In America; The History And Romance Of Old Towpaths And Waterways
 Lost Bonanzas: Tales of the Legendary Lost Mines of the Old West
 Suzanna: A Romance of Early California
 Laramie Rides Alone
 Montana Road
 Lone Wolf of Drygulch Trail/More Precious Than Gold
 Following the Grass 
 This Way to Hell (1933) writing as Stewart Cross.
Screenplay Novelizations (all published by A. L. Burt, circa 1929–1932):
 The Champ
 Madam Satan
 Rio Rita
 The Singer of Seville (alternate title for Call of the Flesh)
 The Trespasser

Legacy
Drago's papers are at Syracuse University.

References

External links

1880s births
1979 deaths
20th-century American male writers
20th-century American screenwriters
American male novelists
American male screenwriters
American Western (genre) novelists